From This Moment On may refer to:

 From This Moment On (album), a 2007 album by Diana Krall
 From This Moment On!, a 1968 album by jazz saxophonist Charles McPherson
 "From This Moment On" (Cole Porter song) (1951)
 "From This Moment On" (Shania Twain song) (1997)
 "From This Moment On", an outtake from The Carpenters' fifth television special, featured on the remastered Interpretations DVD (2003)
 "From This Moment On", a 1968 single by Bonnie Guitar from her album Leaves Are the Tears of Autumn
 From This Moment On, a 1975 album by George Morgan, or its title song
 From This Moment On, a one-woman show by Sally Ann Howes
From This Moment On, a 2002 romance novel by Lynn Kurland